Marko Dijakovic (born 18 March 2002) is an Austrian professional football player who plays for SK Rapid Wien.

Club career 
Marko Dijakovic made his professional debut for SK Rapid Wien on the 20 November 2021, coming on as late substitute in the 1–0 Australian Bundesliga win over SCR Altach.

International career
Born in Austria, Dijakovic is of Serbian descent. He is a youth international for Austria.

References

External links

2002 births
Living people
Footballers from Vienna
Austrian footballers
Austria youth international footballers
Austrian people of Serbian descent
Association football defenders
SK Rapid Wien players
Austrian Football Bundesliga players